"Something Beautiful" is the third episode of the fourth season of the AMC television series Better Call Saul, a spin-off series of Breaking Bad. The episode aired on August 20, 2018, on AMC in the United States. Outside of the United States, the episode premiered on streaming service Netflix in several countries.

Plot
Nacho Varga aids Victor and Tyrus Kitt in making it appear that Nacho's car was attacked and the drugs he and Arturo Colon picked up at Los Pollos Hermanos were stolen. Victor and Tyrus riddle the car and Arturo's body with bullets and shoot Nacho twice. Nacho calls the Cousins, who burn the car and take Nacho to veterinarian Dr. Caldera, who succeeds in saving Nacho's life.

Juan Bolsa tells Gus Fring that because drug and cash shipments have been disrupted several times, Gus should begin investigating the feasibility of making meth within the United States rather than relying on cocaine from Mexico, unaware this is what Gus intended. Gus visits Gale Boetticher, a post-graduate student and researcher at the University of New Mexico, who reports on the poor quality of a meth sample Gus asked him to evaluate. Gale says he could produce a higher quality product, but Gus assures him he is destined for better things.

Jimmy McGill asks Mike Ehrmantraut to steal a valuable Hummel figurine from Neff Copiers and replace it with an inexpensive one that looks similar. Mike refuses, so Jimmy turns to Ira. Ira agrees, but during the theft, he finds one of the owners is sleeping in the office. Ira calls Jimmy, who creates a distraction that enables Ira to leave with the Hummel.

Kim Wexler returns to work on the Mesa Verde account. Bank president Kevin Wachtell welcomes her back and shows her plans for the bank's aggressive expansion. Concerned about the rate of growth, and increasingly bored with banking law, Kim gives more of the work to her paralegal, Viola Goto, and asks to be dropped off at the courthouse.

The next morning, Kim gives Jimmy Chuck McGill's letter. Kim offers to leave him to read it alone, but says she wants to stay after Jimmy suggests it. The letter is undated but appears to have been written when Jimmy worked in HHM's mailroom. On the surface the letter is full of praise, but it is slightly condescending and contains backhanded compliments. Jimmy does not respond emotionally and calls it "nice", but Kim begins crying and runs off to their bedroom.

Production

This episode includes the first appearance of Gale Boetticher, a major character from Breaking Bad'''s third season played by David Costabile, into Better Call Saul. Costabile had been in Albuquerque filming Dig while Better Call Sauls team was wrapping up production of the final episode of the first season. He ran into co-producer Peter Gould and had a meal with him, during which they agreed that it would be great to have Gale appear on Better Call Saul. Costabile had not thought about it until he was contacted by the show's team, asking if he was ready to come back as Gale. Costabile was able to work in filming for Better Call Saul between filming on Billions. Costabile had only about a week with the script to memorize both his lines and to be able to sing karaoke to Tom Lehrer's "The Elements", in contrast to his past singing performances on Breaking Bad where he had more time to learn the lyrics. His filming for the episode, done within a day, was between shooting shots for Billions, requiring him to keep his beard he had grown for the role in Billions''; Costabile considered this part of developing the background of the Gale character.

Reception
"Something Beautiful" received critical acclaim. On Rotten Tomatoes, it garnered a perfect 100% rating with an average score of 9/10 based on 18 reviews. The site consensus reads, "'Something Beautiful' is full of strong, small moments that continue to drive the show's complicated characters forward – if ever so slowly."

Ratings
"Something Beautiful" was watched by 1.51 million viewers in the United States on its original air date.

Notes

References

External links
 "Something Beautiful" at AMC
 

Better Call Saul (season 4) episodes
Television episodes directed by Daniel Sackheim